Jodymoon is a Singer-songwriter duo from Maastricht, the Netherlands. Singer-pianist Digna Janssen and multi-instrumentalist Johan Smeets, who are a couple, formed the band in 2006. They describe their music as ‘a blend between singer-songwriter, folk, pop, classical and roots’. Cello and violin play a significant part on their albums as well as playing live.

Jodymoon have won the public's choice award of ‘The Grand Prize of the Netherlands’ (2008), over the last years they performed in Canada, UK, Spain, Italy, Belgium, Germany and the Netherlands. They also played as supporting act for Joan Armatrading, Damien Jurado, Tom McRae and others.

Discography
 Look at Me Look at Me Don't Look at Me (2006)
 Never Gonna Find It in Another Story (2008)
 Who Are You Now (2010)
 The Life You Never Planned On (2012)
 All Is Waiting (2015)
 A Love Brand New (2019)

References

External links
Jodymoon at Discogs
Live Review at VPRO3voor12
Album review at Muzikmagazin
Album review at Blueszine
Album review at New Folk Sounds

Dutch indie rock groups
Indie folk groups